Zacharias Allewelt (1682 – 1744) was a Norwegian sea captain and slave trader. Allewelt was born in Bergen in 1682. In 1725, he captained the galiot Den unge Jomfrue when it embarked on a trading voyage to the Guinea region of West Africa, where the slave ship purchased a group of African slaves and then transported them to and sold them in the Danish West Indies. Allewelt also captained the Den unge Jomfrue as it repeated the voyage the next year; in total, he captained six slave-trading voyages. He later sailed for the Asiatic Company, first as the chief mate onboard the East Indiaman Slesvig, and then from 1735 onwards as captain of the Dronningen av Danmark. 

He made three journeys to Canton, China. In China, Allewelt commissioned local artists to create two life-size clay busts of him; one is now kept at the Aust-Agder Cultural History Center in Arendal, Norway, and the other is located at the M/S Maritime Museum of Denmark in Kronborg. Allewelt married Gjertrud Andersdatter Dahll, a woman from Neskilen, in the village of Eydehavn in 1725. They lived alternately in Copenhagen and Allewelt's farm on Merdø island off the Arendal coast. He died in Copenhagen in 1744.

References

1682 births
1744 deaths
18th-century Norwegian businesspeople
Norwegian emigrants to Denmark
Norwegian sailors
Norwegian slave traders
People from Bergen